Veyretia is a genus of terrestrial orchids native to South America and Trinidad.

Veyretia aphylla (Ridl.) Szlach. - Colombia, Venezuela, Guyana, Brazil
Veyretia caudata (R.J.V.Alves) Mytnik - Minas Gerais
Veyretia cogniauxiana (Barb.Rodr. ex Cogn.) Szlach. - Minas Gerais
Veyretia hassleri (Cogn.) Szlach. - Brazil, Paraguay
Veyretia neuroptera (Rchb.f. & Warm.) Szlach. - Colombia, Venezuela, Argentina, Brazil
Veyretia rupicola (Garay) F.Barros - Brazil
Veyretia sagittata (Rchb.f. & Warm.) Szlach. - French Guiana, Argentina, Brazil
Veyretia simplex (Griseb.) Szlach. - Trinidad, Venezuela, Guyana, Brazil
Veyretia sincorensis (Schltr.) Szlach. - Bahia
Veyretia szlachetkoana Mytnik - Colombia, Venezuela
Veyretia undulata Szlach. - Brazil

References

Cranichideae genera
Spiranthinae